Paul Holes (born March 15, 1968) is an American former cold-case investigator for the Contra Costa County Sheriff's Office. Holes is known for his contributions to solving the Golden State Killer case using advanced methods of identifying the killer with DNA and genealogy technology. Since retiring in March 2018, Holes has contributed to books, television, and podcasts about the Golden State Killer and true crime.

Education 
Holes studied at the University of California, Davis, from 1986 to 1990. There he received his Bachelor of Science in biochemistry.

Investigative career 
Holes was sworn in as an investigator for the Contra Costa County Sheriff's Office in Martinez, California, in 1994. In the same year, Holes first discovered the cold case files of the East Area Rapist (EAR). His interest in the case was ignited and he remained close to the files, reviewing them any chance he had between active cases in Contra Costa County until a DNA break in 2001 expanded the case even further. When DNA from the EAR matched other unsolved murder crimes throughout California, the case again gained traction and had expanded in evidence.

After years of gathering evidence and using as many DNA samples as he could without depleting the evidence, Holes made contact with genealogist and scientist Barbara Rae-Venter. Rae-Venter used DNA from the Golden State Killer to construct a genetic profile of the suspect and create a family tree that was detailed enough to narrow down the suspects to Joseph James DeAngelo.

In March 2018, Holes visited the Citrus Heights home of DeAngelo on his final day as an investigator before his retirement. Holes watched the home for the activity of DeAngelo, who at the time was only a leading suspect tied to the Golden State Killer rapes and murders. Holes decided not to approach the home for fear of causing a disturbance or tipping off DeAngelo of any suspicion of his involvement as a suspect in the case. Using discarded DNA samples from DeAngelo's home, detectives were able to match his DNA to that known to be from the Golden State Killer. DeAngelo was later taken into custody by the Sacramento Police on April 24, 2018.

While researching the EAR case, it began to be strongly suspected by some that another high profile unsolved case, the Visalia Ransacker, and the EAR were the same person based on evidence similarity. However, unlike the Golden State Killer case, no current DNA link existed. In a 2017 interview, Holes was skeptical of the link between the two, based on credible witness descriptions, but changed his mind after the DeAngelo arrest.

The Murder Squad 
In 2019, Holes and investigative journalist Billy Jensen released a true crime podcast called The Murder Squad that explored evidence and discussions of unsolved murders, unidentified remains, and missing persons cases. The weekly podcast was a production of Exactly Right, a podcast network created by Karen Kilgariff and Georgia Hardstark, hosts of My Favorite Murder. The podcast was cancelled by the network in May 2022.

Personal life 
Holes is currently married and has two adult daughters and two adult sons.

In the media 
Holes became an internet sensation following the attention of his role while investigating the Golden State Killer case with Michelle McNamara, the now deceased writer and creator of the famous Golden State Killer name. He has also been a celebrated name with Murderinos, fans of the My Favorite Murder podcast, which started the #HotforHoles fanbase.

Holes has been published and featured in many media outlets in discussion with the Golden State Killer leading up to and following DeAngelo's arrest.

2000
 Cold Case Files: Season 2, episode 22
2009
 MysteryQuest: Season 1, episode 3
 THS Investigates: The Original Night Stalker
2016
 Crime Watch Daily: Season 2, episode 52
2017
 48 Hours: Season 30, episode 34
 48 Hours on ID: Season 8, episode 20
 On the Case with Paula Zahn: Season 15, episode 3
 Casefile True Crime Podcast: Case 53: EAR/ONS; Bonus episode #2: Interview with Paul Holes
2018
 The Golden State Killer: It's Not Over: Season 1, episodes 1–4
 Evil Has a Name: The Untold Story of the Golden State Killer Investigation: audiobook writer, narrator
2018-2019
 Unmasking a Killer: Season 1, episodes 1–7
2019-2020
 The DNA of Murder with Paul Holes
2020
I'll Be Gone In The Dark
2021
 The Riddle of Emmon Bodfish: audiobook writer, narrator
 A Devil in the Valley: audiobook writer, narrator
2022
 Unmasked: My Life Solving America's Cold Cases: memoir
2023
 Real Life Nightmare'', Season 4

References

External links

 

Living people
Law enforcement workers from California
University of California, Davis alumni
1968 births